Ösbyträsk Nature Reserve is a nature reserve in Stockholm County in Sweden.

The nature reserve has been created to protect the lake Ösbyträsk and the surrounding area. The nature is varied and the area also has a rich cultural heritage.

References

External links

Nature reserves in Sweden
Geography of Stockholm County
Tourist attractions in Stockholm County